The 2002 United States Senate election in Texas was held on November 5, 2002. Incumbent Republican U.S. Senator Phil Gramm decided to retire, instead of seeking a fourth term. State Attorney General Republican John Cornyn won the open seat. This was the first open-seat election since 1984.

Democratic Primary

 Ron Kirk, Mayor of Dallas
 Victor Morales, Teacher, Navy Veteran, 1996 Senate nominee
 Ken Bentsen Jr., U.S. representative, nephew of former US Senator Lloyd Bentsen

Primary

Source: OurCampaigns.com, TX US Senate - D Primary

Runoff

Source: OurCampaigns.com, TX US Senate - D Runoff

Republican Primary
 John Cornyn, Attorney General of Texas

Primary

Source: OurCampaigns.com, TX US Senate - R Primary

General election

Campaign
Despite the fact that Texas is a red state, Kirk ran on a socially progressive platform: supporting abortion rights and opposing Bush judicial nominee Priscilla Richman, although Kirk was a former George W. Bush supporter. He also supported increases in defense spending, such as Bush's proposed $48 billion increase in military spending, except for the money Bush wanted to use for missile defense. Kirk had the support of former Governor Ann Richards and former U.S. Senator Lloyd Bentsen.

Cornyn was criticized for taking campaign money from Enron and other controversial companies. And although other Democrats have seized on the issue, Kirk is well-entrenched in the Dallas business community, and his wife resigned from two private-sector jobs that created potential conflicts of interest for Kirk while he was mayor.

An October Dallas Morning News poll had Cornyn leading 47% to 37%. A record $18 million was spent in the election.

Debates
Complete video of debate, October 18, 2002
Complete video of debate, October 23, 2002

Predictions

Polling

Results

See also 
 2002 United States Senate election

Notes

References 

United States Senate
Texas
2002